Plaza de Toros de Cali or Arena Cañaveralejo (official name) is a bull ring in Cali, Colombia. It is used for bull fighting. Initial capacity was of 16,954 and it opened in 1957. Between 2019 and 2020 had update capacity of 14 368. It is located on Avenida Guadalupe, 3, Cali.

References

External links
 Plaza de Toros de Cali official site

Buildings and structures completed in 1957
Bullrings in Colombia